The Roman Catholic Diocese of Kandy (Lat: Dioecesis Kandiensis) is a suffragan diocese of the Latin Church of the Roman Catholic Church in the ecclesiastical province (covering all Sri Lanka) of the Metropolitan Archbishopric of Colombo, but depends on the missionary Roman Congregation for the Evangelization of Peoples.

The episcopal seat is St. Anthony’s Cathedral, in Kandy. The current bishop is Valence Mendis, appointed in 2021.

Statistics 
As per 2014, it pastorally served 81,293 Catholics (3.2% of 2,578,000 total) on 5,733 km² in 27 parishes and 2 missions with 51 priests (39 diocesan, 12 religious), 329 lay religious (149 brothers, 180 sisters) and 15 seminarians.

History 
 Originally erected on 20 April 1883 as the Apostolic vicariate of Kandy, on territory split off from the then diocese of Colombo (soon promoted Archdiocese of Colombo, now its Metropolitan) 
 Promoted to Diocese of Kandy on 1 September 1886, as a suffragan of the simultaneously elevated Archdiocese of Colombo.
 On 18 December 1972, part of the diocese was split off to form the Diocese of Badulla.

Episcopal ordinaries
Apostolic Vicars of Kandy
 Clemente Pagnani, Sylvestrines (O.S.B.Silv.) (20 April 1883 Appointed - 1 September 1886), Titular Bishop of Hephæstum (1879.11.12 – 1886.09.01), first as Bishop of Colombo (Sri Lanka) (1879.11.12 – 1883.04.20)

Bishops of Kandy
 Clemente Pagnani, O.S.B.Silv. (1 September 1886 - death June 1911) 
 Bede Beekmeyer, O.S.B.Silv. (19 April 1912 - death 22 May 1935) 
 Bernardo Regno, O.S.B.Silv. (27 January 1936 - retired 24 September 1958), stayed on a while as Apostolic Administrator of Kandy (1958.09.24 – 1959.07.02), during emeritate as Titular Bishop of Bagai (1958.09.24 – 1971.01.26), died 1977
 Leo Nanayakkara, O.S.B.Silv. (2 July 1959 - 18 December 1972), next Bishop of Badulla (1972.12.18 – death 1982.05.28) 
 Appasinghe Paul Perera (17 May 1973 - death 16 May 1989) 
 Joseph Vianney Fernando (17 March 1983 - 9 October 2021), also President of Bishops’ Conference of Sri Lanka (1995 – 1998 and 2004.04 – 2010.04)
 Valence Mendis (9 October 2021 – present)

See also 
 List of Catholic dioceses in Sri Lanka and the Maldives
 Catholic Church in Sri Lanka

Sources and external links 
 GCatholic, with Goggle satellite photo - data for all sections
 Catholic Encyclopedia: Diocese of Kandy

Kandy